Rubens Menin Teixeira de Souza (born 12 March 1956) is a Brazilian billionaire businessman and co-founder, in 1979, of MRV Engenharia, Brazil's leading home builder, which has a market capitalization of $1.4 billion. As of March 2022, his net worth is estimated at US$1.3 billion.

He has a bachelor's degree in civil engineering from the Federal University of Minas Gerais, where he graduated in 1978. In June 2018, Rubens Menin was named the Ernst & Young World Entrepreneur Of The Year.

He has been chairman of MRV Engenharia since May 2007.

In May 2021, Menin said that he bought 100% of the broadcasting company Rádio Itatiaia.

He is married, with three children, and lives in Belo Horizonte, Brazil.

References

1956 births
Living people
Brazilian billionaires
Brazilian company founders
People from Belo Horizonte
Federal University of Minas Gerais alumni